Jacqueline I Am Coming is a 2019 Indian Hindi-language drama film directed by Banty Dubey and produced by Manjesh Giri under the banner MD Production. The movie stars Raghubir Yadav, Diiva Dhanoya, Shakti Kumar, and Kiran Patil.

The film premiered at the 2019 Rajasthan International Film Festival and was released on 18 October 2019.

Cast
 Raghubir Yadav as a Kashi Tiwary 
 Diiva Dhanoya as Jacqueline
 Shakti Kumar as Dr. Arjun
 Kiran Patil as Keshav

References

External links
 
 First Post

2019 films
2019 drama films
2010s Hindi-language films
Films about social issues in India
Films set in Madhya Pradesh
Indian films based on actual events
Drama films based on actual events